General elections were held in Monaco on 11 February 2018. Since the General Election of 2013, the largest party, Horizon Monaco, split, which led to the formation of a new political party – Primo! Priorite Monaco. The latter won 58% of the vote, while the other parties, Horizon Monaco and Union Monégasque got 26% and 16% respectively. This led to a 21-seat gain for Primo!, with the 3 remaining seats being divided between Horizon Monaco and Union Monégasque.

Electoral system
Voters can either choose a party list or choose candidates from various lists ("panachage") for the 24 seats. The 16 candidates with the most votes are elected (with the older candidate breaking possible ties in votes). The eight other seats are chosen from lists in accordance with the proportional representation system for parties that have at least five percent of votes.

Voter turnout
70.35% of Monegasque voters cast a vote.

Results

By party

References

External links
Election results

Monaco
Elections in Monaco
2018 in Monaco
February 2018 events in Europe